Nyctibatrachus periyar is a species of frog endemic to the Western Ghats of India. It is known only from the Periyar tiger reserve from where it was described in 2011.

References 

Endemic fauna of India
periyar